This is the list of rail accident lists.

Lists

By year

By type
By country
By death toll
Terrorist incidents

See also

 Classification of railway accidents
 Derailment
Rail Transport
 Train wreck
 Tram accident
 Train-pedestrian fatalities